The Moscow Defence Zone was a front of the Red Army during World War II, to defend Moscow from the German advance. It was set up on 2 December 1941 to manage the troops of 24th and 60th Armies and part of the anti-aircraft defences.

History
The Moscow Defence Zone was established on December 2, 1941. It controlled the armies earmarked for the defence of Moscow, the 24th and 60th Armies.

References

Soviet fronts
Military history of Moscow